Ajaigarh State was one of the princely states of India during the period of the British Raj. The state was ruled by Bundela clan of Rajput. The state was founded in 1785 and its capital was located in Ajaigarh, Madhya Pradesh. Ajaigarh's last ruler signed the accession to the Indian Union on 1 January 1950.

References

Sources
 

Princely states of Bundelkhand
1950 disestablishments in India
Rajputs
Panna district